Kathleen Sampson (23 November 1892 – 21 February 1980) was an English mycologist and plant pathologist, with a focus in herbage crops and cereal diseases. She was a leading authority on smut fungi growing in the British Isles.

Early life 
Sampson was born on 23 November 1892 in Chesterfield, Derbyshire. She received her Bachelor of Science from Royal Holloway College, University of London in 1914. During her study Sampson was awarded the London University Gilchrist Scholarship for Women in 1913, and the Driver Scholarship for Botany in 1914 as well as being awarded the Driver essay prize in 1914. She graduated with her Masters in Science in 1917 which was focused on phylloglossum and overseen by fossil fern specialist Professor Margaret Benson. The results from her thesis were published in the Annals of Botany in the same year.

Career 
Sampson worked at the University of Leeds as an agricultural botany lecturer between 1915 and 1917. During this time she worked with Professor George Stapledon to test seeds for farmers as part of a wartime project. After the war Sampson worked at the University of Wales as an agricultural botany senior lecturer between 1919 and 1945, during which she helped set up the Welsh Plant Breeding Station. She was a member of the British Mycological Society for sixty years, serving as President in 1938. Her presidential address to the society is entitled Life cycles of smut fungi. Upon her retirement, Sampson moved to Aylesbury, Buckinghampshire where she set up a garden and bird sanctuary. When she died in 1980 she donated most of her estate to the Royal Society for the Protection of Birds.

Selected publications

Articles

Books 
 Diseases of British Grasses and Herbage Legumes (1941)

References 

1892 births
1980 deaths
People from Chesterfield, Derbyshire
Alumni of Royal Holloway, University of London
Alumni of the University of London
Alumni of the University of Leeds
English mycologists
Women mycologists
Academics of Aberystwyth University
English scientists
People associated with the University of Wales